Tellurite glasses contain tellurium oxide (TeO2) as the main component.

References

Glass compositions
Tellurium